Rheosaurus sulcarostrum is a species of lizard in the family Gymnophthalmidae. The species is endemic to Guyana. It is monotypic in the genus Rheosaurus.

Habitat
R. sulcarostrum is found in leaf litter on the floor of high-canopy rainforest.

Geographic range
R. sulcarostrum has been found in northwestern Guyana at low elevation. Because of its secretive habitat, it is likely to be found elsewhere.

References

External links
.

Echinosaura
Reptiles of Guyana
Endemic fauna of Guyana
Reptiles described in 2006
Taxa named by Maureen Ann Donnelly
Taxa named by Ross Douglas MacCulloch
Taxa named by Cristina A. Ugarte
Taxa named by David A. Kizirian
Taxobox binomials not recognized by IUCN